Ömerli Dam is a rock-fill dam in Istanbul Province, Turkey.

Ömerli Dam is located in Çekmeköy district of Istanbul Province. The rock-fill dam was built by the Turkish State Hydraulic Works on the Riva Creek to provide tap water for the city. Construction started in 1968, and the dam went in service in 1973.

In 1999, a sanitation project was launched to protect the reservoir from waste water pollution. In the time span of the last twenty years after the construction of the dam, the surrounding area saw a rapid urbanization that brought the risk of pollution of the reservoir. The project foresaw the collection of waste water by collectors and treatment in sewage plants before emptying into the sea.

See also
List of dams and reservoirs in Turkey

References

Dams in Istanbul Province
Embankment dams
Dams completed in 1973
1973 establishments in Turkey
Çekmeköy